Keith Burnell (born January 8, 1979) is a former American football and Canadian football running back and cornerback who played for one season in the Canadian Football League (CFL) for the Hamilton Tiger-Cats in 2005. He played college football for Virginia Tech and Delaware, and spent time on practice squads and offseason rosters for the Green Bay Packers, New York Jets, Oakland Raiders, and Baltimore Ravens of the National Football League (NFL).

Professional career

National Football League
Burnell was signed by the Green Bay Packers as an undrafted free agent on May 3, 2003, as a defensive back. He also played running back in college. He was moved to running back on July 26 during training camp after an injury to another running back in practice. He was waived during final roster cuts on August 25, 2003. He was signed to the New York Jets' practice squad on September 30, 2003, but was released on October 15. He was signed to the Oakland Raiders' practice squad on November 5. He was signed to a futures contract on December 29, 2003. After spending training camp in 2004 with the Raiders, he was waived on August 4, 2004. He re-signed with the Jets on August 15, 2004, but was waived on August 24. He was re-signed to the Jets' practice squad on October 14. He was signed by the Baltimore Ravens to a futures contract on February 3, 2005. After spending training camp with the Ravens in 2005, he was waived during final roster cuts on August 29.

Canadian Football League
Burnell signed with the Hamilton Tiger-Cats on November 3, 2005. He played in one game for the Tiger-Cats, and was re-signed to a contract on May 3, 2006. He was released on May 10.

References

External links
Delaware Fightin' Blue Hens football bio

1979 births
Living people
American football running backs
American football cornerbacks
Virginia Tech Hokies football players
Delaware Fightin' Blue Hens football players
Green Bay Packers players
New York Jets players
Oakland Raiders players
Baltimore Ravens players
Hamilton Tiger-Cats players